Uffington House is in Dee Hills Park, Chester, Cheshire, England.  It was built in 1885 for Thomas Hughes, the author of Tom Brown's School Days, and designed by Edward Ould.  It is constructed in red brick with stone and terracotta dressings and a red tile roof.  The house is in three storeys with cellars and an attic.  Its architectural features include turrets surmounted by spires with lead finials.  The house is recorded in the National Heritage List for England as a designated Grade II listed building.

See also

Grade II listed buildings in Chester (east)
List of works by Grayson and Ould

References

Houses completed in 1885
Grade II listed buildings in Chester
Houses in Chester
Grade II listed houses